Tintagel is a village and civil parish in Cornwall, England, UK.

Tintagel can also refer to:
 Tintagel (Bax), a 1919 musical composition by Arnold Bax
 Tintagel Castle, a castle near the village
 , a World War II era ship of the Royal Navy
 Tintagel Colombo, residence of Sri Lankan Prime Ministers Solomon and Sirimavo Bandaranaike
 Tintagel, three drawings by John William Inchbold
 Tintagel,  an English Christian folk rock band who performed at the Greenbelt Festival in 1991